INSAT-2C (also known as Indian National Satellite-2) was an Indian geostationary communications spacecraft. It is ISRO's third indigenous communications satellite.

History 
It was launched by Ariane 44L from Guiana Space Centre, French Guiana in December 6, 1995. It was working properly for years, but in January 2013, it's communication C-band transponder collapsed. It was launched to improve communication facilities in Northeast India and Andaman and Nicobar Islands.

Information 
It's mass during launch was 2,106 kg and dry mass was 946 kg. It revolves around Geostationary orbit with altitude of 35,786 and longitude of 93.5 degree east. It's onboard power was 1,320 Watts with mission life of 7 years and its planned orbit life to be very long.

Capabilities 
It has capabilities like business communication, mobile satellite service and can make television outreach beyond boundary of India.

References 

INSAT satellites